Eunidia bicolor is a species of beetle in the family Cerambycidae. It was described by Gardner in 1936.

References

Eunidiini
Beetles described in 1936